Cheidae is a family of crustaceans belonging to the order Amphipoda.

Genera:
 Cheus Thurston, 1982
 Microcheus Souza-Fihlo, 2011
 Ruffosius Souza-Fihlo, 2011

References

Amphipoda